The 1999 Scottish Cup Final was played on 29 May 1999, at Hampden Park in Glasgow and was the final of the 114th Scottish Cup. Celtic and Rangers contested the match, Rangers won the match 1–0, thanks to Rod Wallace's 48th-minute goal where he shot left footed into the corner of the goal when the ball broke to him in the box four yards out. This was the first match at Hampden Park since the stadium was re-vamped.

Match details

See also
Old Firm

References

1999
Scottish Cup Final 1999
Scottish Cup Final 1999
Cup Final
20th century in Glasgow
Old Firm matches